"Army Dreamers" is a 1980 song, the third and final single to be released from the album Never for Ever, by Kate Bush. It was a UK top 20 hit in October 1980.

Background 
"Army Dreamers" was released on 22 September 1980 and peaked at number 16 in the UK Singles Chart. The song is about the effects of war and about a mother who grieves for her young adult son, who was killed on military manoeuvres. Saddened by his unnecessary death, she wrestles with her guilt over what she could have done to prevent it. The song is a waltz, which marks a change to Bush's previous singles. The version on the original single release is longer than on the album release; the album version fades, whereas the single release has a dead ending (the version of the single from The Single File, however, fades like the album release).

The single includes two B-sides, "Delius" and "Passing Through Air". "Delius" is Bush's tribute to English composer Frederick Delius. The subtitle, "Song of Summer", comes from one of Delius's works, and from a BBC film Bush saw about the composer's life. Again, it's of note that the album version is different in that the previous track "Babooshka" segues into it, whereas the single B-side version begins unobscured. "Passing Through Air" is one of Bush's earliest works—originally recorded in 1973 at David Gilmour's studio, a few weeks after her 15th birthday.

The reference in the lyrics to "BFPO" refers to "British Forces Post Office", the postal system for the British armed forces, who deliver the message: "Our little army boy is coming home, from BFPO."

"Army Dreamers" was one of 68 songs considered inappropriate for airplay by the BBC during the first Gulf War.

Promotional video 
The music video opens on a closeup of Kate Bush, dressed in dark green camouflage, holding a child. She blinks in synchronisation with the song's sampled gun cocks. The camera pulls out and shows that Bush has a white-haired child on her lap. The child walks off and returns in military combat uniform, and during the first pre-chorus, as Bush responds to her bandmates' comments, the child grows up into a 20-year-old. Bush and several soldiers (two of whom, Bush included, have "KT8" or "KTB" stencilled on the butt of their rifles: "KTB" was a monogram used by Bush early in her career) make their way through woodland, amid explosions. As the song progresses, Bush reaches out for the child soldier, but he disappears. Finally, Bush is blown up.

Bush has stated that this video is one of the few examples of her work that completely satisfies her:

For me that's the closest that I've got to a little bit of film. And it was very pleasing for me to watch the ideas I'd thought of actually working beautifully. Watching it on the screen. It really was a treat, that one. I think that's the first time ever with anything I've done I can actually sit back and say "I liked that". That's the only thing. Everything else I can sit there going "Oh look at that, that's out of place". So I'm very pleased with that one, artistically.

Track listing 
 "Army Dreamers" – 3:17
 "Delius" – 2:51
 "Passing Through Air" – 2:10

Charts

See also
 List of anti-war songs

References 

Kate Bush songs
1980 singles
Songs written by Kate Bush
EMI Records singles
Anti-war songs
1980 songs